The Hawaiian records in swimming are the fastest ever performances of swimmers from Hawaii, which are maintained by Hawaiian Swimming. Hawaii is no official Fina member, but Hawaiian Swimming is the Local Swim Committee of USA Swimming that governs the sport of swimming in the geographical area of the state of Hawaii.

All records were set in finals unless noted otherwise.

Long Course (50 m)

Men

Women

Mixed relay

Short Course (25 m)

Men

Women

References
General
 Hawaiian Long Course records 12 July 2022 updated
Swimming

External links
 Hawaiian Swimming web site

Hawaii
Records
Swimming records